Tomasz Brzyski (born 10 January 1982) is a Polish professional footballer who plays as a left back or midfielder for Lublinianka.

Career
On 29 June 2018, Brzyski signed a contract with III liga club Motor Lublin.

International goals
Scores and results list Poland's goal tally first.

References

External links
 
 
 

1982 births
Living people
Sportspeople from Lublin
Association football defenders
Polish footballers
Poland international footballers
KS Lublinianka players
Górnik Łęczna players
Radomiak Radom players
Korona Kielce players
Ruch Chorzów players
Polonia Warsaw players
Legia Warsaw players
MKS Cracovia (football) players
Sandecja Nowy Sącz players
Motor Lublin players
Chełmianka Chełm players
Ekstraklasa players
III liga players
IV liga players